Café Schwarzenberg is a traditional Viennese coffee house, located on the Ringstraße boulevard (Kärntner Ring No. 17) near Schwarzenbergplatz in the central Innere Stadt district of Vienna, Austria. Unlike many other traditional Viennese coffeehouses, the Cafe Schwarzenberg did not cater to a clientele of artists and intellectuals. The interior is notable for having remained largely unchanged since it was opened in the 19th century.

History

Café Schwarzenberg is the oldest existing Ringstraße coffee house, opened during the construction of the prestigious boulevard in 1861 by a married couple with the family name Hochleitner. It quickly became an important meeting place for influential entrepreneurs and financiers. Among the famous frequent guests was the architect Josef Hoffmann (1870–1956), one of the founders of the artistic Wiener Werkstätte manufacturing company. Many of Hoffmann's designs were drafted at Café Schwarzenberg.

After World War II in Allied-occupied Austria, the Soviet Red Army used the space as an officers' mess for various events. As a result of this the decor was damaged by gunfire, the results of which were apparent as late as 1979. Café Schwarzenberg was run by the Österreichisches Verkehrsbüro travel company until 1 January 2008, when it was purchased by the Austrian Vivatis food company.

Today Café Schwarzenberg with its Schanigarten on the Ringstraße sidewalk is a popular spot with both tourists and locals. As well as hosting a wide variety of cultural events such as readings and concerts, it hosts Kaffeehausmusik ("Coffee House Music") on several evenings during the week. In the Viennese ball season, the Cafe Schwarzenberg is one of the few cafés to offer early morning goulash and beer breakfasts for the ball attendees.

See also
 List of restaurants in Vienna

References
 Felix Czeike: Historisches Lexikon Wien. Band 1. Verlag Kremayr & Scheriau, Wien 1992, S. 540.
 Hans Veigl: Wiener Kaffeehausführer. Kremayr und Scheriau, Wien 1994, .

External links
Café Schwarzenberg website
Fodors Review

Schwarzenberg
Buildings and structures in Innere Stadt